Nicky Salapu (born September 13, 1980) is an American Samoan footballer who plays as a goalkeeper for PanSa East. He previously played for PanSa East from 2000 to 2008 and 2008 to 2011, then he left them to sign for Mitra Kukar in 2012. Salapu has played for them since 2013. He played in American Samoa's 31–0 loss to Australia, where he was the only player from the senior squad remaining after the rest of the squad was ruled ineligible due to holding Samoan, rather than US, passports.

Salapu played in the OFC FIFA World Cup Qualifications for World Cup 2002 and World Cup 2006. American Samoa lost all of these eight matches, and conceded 91 goals.

Salapu was the goalkeeper, under whom the American Samoa National Football Team registered their first ever official FIFA World Cup qualifiers win. After the game, Salapu said: "I feel like a champ right now. Finally I'm going to put the past behind me."

Club career 
Salapu played for PanSa East for eleven years, beginning in 2000 and terminating in 2011. In 2012 he went to play for Mitra Kukar, a club playing in the Indonesia Super League (ISL), which is a fully professional football competition as the top tier of the football league pyramid in Indonesia.

International career 
Salapu conceded 31 goals to Australia in a World Cup qualifying match on April 11, 2001, and the score Australia 31–0 American Samoa still counts as the official world record.

In 2007, Salapu missed his flight from Hawaii to the South Pacific Games in Samoa. Because he could not make it on time, he was replaced by the 17-year-old Jordan Penitusi. He was not eligible to play until he arrived for the last match of American Samoa in the South Pacific Games with Tonga, but there he was an unused substitute. In November 2011, Salapu was the goalkeeper when American Samoa won its first ever full FIFA match, a 2–1 win over Tonga during the first round of the OFC qualifiers for the 2014 FIFA World Cup. In 2015, he was called up as substitute goalkeeper for the 2018 World Cup Qualifiers. 

He represented American Samoa at the 2019 Pacific Games in Apia. Salapu has been selected for the American Samoan team at the 2023 Pacific Games in Honiara.

Career statistics

International

See also
Next Goal Wins (2014 film)

References

External links 

1980 births
Living people
American Samoan footballers
American Samoa international footballers
Association football goalkeepers
American Samoan expatriate footballers
Expatriate footballers in Indonesia
Mitra Kukar players
People from Pago Pago
American Samoan expatriate sportspeople in Indonesia
FFAS Senior League players